César Vigevani(born 30 August 1974),is an Argentine professional football manager.

Coaching career
César Vigevani started coaching career with youth teams of River Plate club in Argentina. His first stint as a manager of the main team was with River Ecuador in 2008. He managed clubs in Various countries like Peru, Chile, 
Ecuador, Bolivia. He managed famous clubs like Bolívar in Bolivia and Binacional in Peru.

References

External links

1974 births
Living people
Argentine football managers
Sport Boys Warnes managers
Club Bolívar managers
Deportivo Binacional FC managers
Cienciano managers
Guayaquil City F.C. managers
Huachipato managers
Cobreloa managers
Mushuc Runa S.C. managers
Unión San Felipe managers
Imbabura S.C. managers